Penzeys Spices is a retailer of spices in the United States. It operates retail outlets as well as mail order and online shopping.  The company is headquartered in Wauwatosa, Wisconsin, and had 600,000 catalog customers in 2007.

History
In 1957, William Penzey Sr. and Ruth Ann Penzey opened a coffee and spice business in Milwaukee, Wisconsin, which came to be called The Spice House. Their son, William Penzey Jr. (Bill), began working in the business as a youth. Over time The Spice House focused on selling spices.

In 1986, at the age of 22, Bill launched a catalog business of his own. The business grew steadily, and in 1994 Penzeys opened its first retail store. By 2013, 69 Penzeys stores were open throughout North America.

Retail contraction
In 2012, Penzeys had 67 retail locations in 29 states. In March 2020, Penzeys announced closures due to the COVID-19 pandemic.  By June 2021, the number of locations had contracted to 53.

Newsletter controversy
On January 14, 2022, CEO Bill Penzey sent out an email newsletter announcing the he would be renaming the extended Martin Luther King Jr. Day sale weekend to "Republicans are racist weekend", with the reasons given including alleged voter suppression in red states and their response to the George Floyd Protests. Penzey was widely criticized for this email, with 40,000 people unsubscribing from their newsletter, however, Penzey stated that 30,000 new people had signed up to their newsletter. Penzey made a similar statement in an email sent out on the first anniversary of the January 6th Capitol riot, calling Republicans the "#1 threat to this country".

References

Bibliography
Penzey, Bill; Penzeys One Staff (2008).  How We Became One. Kitchen Table Communications, 2008.

External links
 

Food retailers of the United States
Spices
American companies established in 1957
Companies based in Wisconsin